Deyr may refer to:
 Deyr County in Bushehr Province, Iran.
 Bandar Deyr, a town in Deyr County.
 Deir ez-Zor, is the 6th largest city in Syria.
 Deyr is the local name of a rain season in East Africa